The fencing competitions at the 2015 European Games in Baku were held from 23 to 27 June 2015 at the Crystal Hall 3. Twelve events (six individual, six team) were contested. This is two more than the Olympic Games programme, and means all three formats had a team event in each gender.

Qualification

216 athletes will compete across the twelve events. The quota places will be awarded based on the FIE rankings at 30 November 2014. In December 2014, a qualification tournament will be held to decide the universality quota places.

Timetable

Events summary

Men's

Women's

Medal table

References

 
Sports at the 2015 European Games
2015
European Games
Fencing competitions in Azerbaijan